Outerbridge is the surname of a notable family centred in Bailey's Bay, an unincorporated community in Hamilton Parish, Bermuda; the family later spread to the United States and Canada, with a branch returning to Great Britain. It is also used as a given name.

People with the surname 
 Eugenius Harvey Outerbridge (1860–1932), of the Port Authority of New York and New Jersey
 Frances Outerbridge (1846-1934) nurse and suffragist/suffragette
 Sir Joseph Outerbridge (1843-1933), prominent Bermudian business man and philanthropist in Newfoundland (brother of Eugenius Harvey Outerbridge)
 Sir Leonard Cecil Outerbridge (1888-1986), Lieutenant-Governor of Newfoundland between 1949 and 1957 (son of Sir Joseph Outerbridge)
 Mary Ewing Outerbridge (1852–1886), imported the game of tennis into the U.S. from Bermuda (sister of Sir Joseph Outerbridge and Eugenius Harvey Outerbridge)
 Paul Outerbridge (1896–1958), American photographer
 Peter Outerbridge (born 1966), Canadian actor
 Samuel Cornelius Outerbridge (1826–1901), MCP of the House of Assembly of the Parliament of Bermuda for thirty-seven years
 Thomas Leslie Outerbridge (died 1927), Bermudian participant in the U.S. Civil War 
 William Woodward Outerbridge (1906–1986), commanded USS Ward in the first U.S. naval action of World War II

People with the given name 

 Outerbridge Horsey (1777–1842), U.S. Senator from Delaware
 Outerbridge Horsey (diplomat) (1910–1983), American diplomat